Michael Jude Luzzi (born October 27, 1969 in Wilmington, Delaware) is an American jockey. He grew up near Delaware Park Racetrack where his grandfather, trainer Buddy Raines, had a major role in raising him and his brother John who also became a jockey. One of the family's great memories came in 1991 when the then eighty-year-old Raines saddled Timely Warning and watched as his grandson won the Maryland Million Classic and the Brooklyn Handicap.

Luzzi began his riding career in 1988 at race tracks in Maryland and in 1989 was voted the Eclipse Award for Outstanding Apprentice Jockey. He won five races in a single day at Pimlico Race Course on September 21, 1993. In 1994, he moved his tack to NY to compete on the New York Racing Association circuit. Luzzi has been a mainstay on the NYRA circuit since his arrival. In 1994 and in 2001 the NYRA voted him the Mike Venezia Memorial Award, an honor given to a jockey who exemplifies extraordinary sportsmanship and citizenship. Since arriving in NY, Luzzi has consistently been one of the top jockeys on the NYRA circuit. In recent years, he has gained some national exposure by riding in various stakes races throughout the United States. On April 12, 2015, Mike Luzzi accepted the George Woolf Memorial Jockey Award at Santa Anita Park. It is one of the highest honors for a jockey and their contributions both on and off the track.

He is the father of jockey Lane Luzzi.

Year-end charts

References
 Mike Luzzi at the NTRA

1969 births
Living people
American jockeys
Eclipse Award winners
Sportspeople from Wilmington, Delaware